Constituent Assembly elections were held alongside a plebiscite on the presidency of Carlos Castillo Armas in Guatemala on 10 October 1954. A reported 99.92% of voters voted in favour of Armas' presidency, whilst the National Anti-Communist Front won 57 of the 65 seats in the Assembly.

Results

Armas as president

Constituent Assembly

Bibliography
Villagrán Kramer, Francisco. Biografía política de Guatemala: años de guerra y años de paz. FLACSO-Guatemala, 2004. 
Political handbook of the world 1954. New York, 1955. 
Elections in the Americas A Data Handbook Volume 1. North America, Central America, and the Caribbean. Edited by Dieter Nohlen. 2005. 
Holden, Robert H. 2004. Armies without nations: public violence and state formation in Central America, 1821-1960. New York: Oxford University Press.
Ebel, Roland H. 1998. Misunderstood caudillo: Miguel Ydigoras Fuentes and the failure of democracy in Guatemala. Lanham: University Press of America.

Referendums in Guatemala
Guatemala
1954 in Guatemala
Election and referendum articles with incomplete results